The Betong Mongkhonrit Tunnel is the first and largest road tunnel in Thailand. It is located in Betong, Yala Province, Thailand. It is a curved tunnel, 268 metres long, connecting the town centre with a newer part of the town to the South-East. The tunnel was opened on 1 January 2001.

References 

Buildings and structures in Yala province
Tunnels in Thailand
Road tunnels